The Bravo Hills are a group of low peaks rising to , which border the Ross Ice Shelf between Gough Glacier and Le Couteur Glacier. They were so named by the Southern Party of the New Zealand Geological Survey Antarctic Expedition (1963–64) because their supply Depot B (Bravo) was located nearby.

See also
Mount Thurman

References
 

Hills of Antarctica
Dufek Coast